Sophie Capewell (born 4 September 1998) is a British professional racing cyclist. She comes from a cycling family, with her father, the late Nigel Capewell representing Great Britain at the 1996 Atlanta and 2000 Sydney Paralympic Games.

She competed in the women's sprint at the 2020 World Championships in Berlin. Capewell then went on to win bronze in the team sprint at the 2021 World Championships in Roubaix, France.

Capewell was selected for the England team for the 2022 Commonwealth Games. Despite taking the first race of three, Capewell ultimately lost the bronze medal final of the women's sprint to Emma Finucane of Wales, finishing fourth overall. However, she bounced back to take 500m time trial bronze the following day. She subsequently won a silver medal in the keirin, which she dedicated to her late father Nigel, who died in October 2021.

References

External links

1998 births
Living people
British female cyclists
British track cyclists
Sportspeople from Lichfield
Cyclists at the 2022 Commonwealth Games
Commonwealth Games competitors for England
Commonwealth Games silver medallists for England
Commonwealth Games bronze medallists for England
21st-century British women
Commonwealth Games medallists in cycling
Medallists at the 2022 Commonwealth Games